The Silver City Woman's Club  is a historic women's club located at 411 Silver Heights Boulevard in Silver City, New Mexico. The club was founded in 1909, and it built its meeting house in 1935–36. Richard Tatsch designed the clubhouse in the Pueblo Revival style, which reflected the region's architectural history. The clubhouse provided two spaces for the club's community activities and private meetings; the former included distributing food to needy families and conducting child welfare inspections on behalf of the state, while the latter included self-improvement courses in music and literature. The women's club has continuously held its activities in the building since its construction; it has also provided a space for community meetings and large events.

The clubhouse was added to the National Register of Historic Places on September 2, 2003.

The Carrizozo Woman's Club and Alamogordo Woman's Club were also listed then;  all three originally were Works Progress Administration projects.  The deterioration of the Carrizozo one, with its being identified as one of the Ten Most Endangered Properties in New Mexico, led to interest by preservationists and woman's club members in all three buildings.

The club operates under the auspices of the New Mexico Federation of Women's Clubs (NMFWC). (now known as GFWC New Mexico).

See also

National Register of Historic Places listings in Grant County, New Mexico

References

External links

Clubhouses on the National Register of Historic Places in New Mexico
Pueblo Revival architecture in New Mexico
Buildings and structures completed in 1936
Buildings and structures in Grant County, New Mexico
Women's club buildings
National Register of Historic Places in Grant County, New Mexico
Women's clubs in the United States
Women's organizations based in the United States
History of women in New Mexico